Omanikkan Ormavaikkan is a 1985 Indian Malayalam-language film, directed by A. B. Raj. The film stars Mohanlal, Santhosh, Maniyanpilla Raju and Menaka in the lead roles. The film has songs composed by Raveendran.

Cast
Mohanlal
Santhosh
Maniyanpilla Raju
Menaka
Baby Shalini

Soundtrack
The music was composed by Raveendran with lyrics by Poovachal Khader.

References

External links
 

1985 films
1980s Malayalam-language films
Films directed by A. B. Raj